Bielecki (feminine: Bielecka; plural: Bieleccy) is a Polish-language surname. It is related to a number of surnames in other languages.

People 
 Adam Bielecki (born 1983), Polish climber
 Barbara Bielecka (born 1931), Polish architect
 Czesław Bielecki (born 1951), Polish architect and politician
 Jan Krzysztof Bielecki (born 1951), Polish politician
 Jerzy Bielecki (disambiguation), multiple individuals
 Karol Bielecki (born 1982), Polish handball player
 Maciej Bielecki (born 1987), Polish cyclist
 Mike Bielecki (born 1959), American baseball player
 Stanisław Bielecki (born 1946), Polish chemist
 Tadeusz Bielecki (1901–1982), Polish politician

See also
 
 
 Volodymyr Biletskyy (born 1950), Ukrainian scientist, politician, activist

Polish-language surnames